Cheuk Wai "Andy" Yan (born 21 October 1983) is a Hong Kong racing driver currently competing in the TCR Asia Series and Chinese Touring Car Championship.

Racing career
Yan began his career in 2011 in the Chinese Touring Car Championship, he won the championship in 2011 and 2013, he ended 2nd in 2012 and 3rd in 2014. He still races there and currently leads the 2015 standings.

On 15 November 2014, Andy Yan won the CTM Macau Touring Car Cup by leading the race from start to finish.

In September 2015 it was announced that he would race in the first ever TCR Asia Series round in Sepang, driving a Ford Focus ST for FRD HK Racing.

On 9 November 2015, Andy Yan wins his third China Touring Car Championship title by six points ahead of Honda driver Henry Ho. Andy Yan overtook the Macanese driver during the race in order to be sure of the title.

On 2 October 2016, Andy Yan, driving for Engstler Motorsport, secured the 2016 TCR Asia Series title with a round to spare.

On 28 December 2017, Andy Yan won the 2017 TCR China Touring Car Championship. In the final event of the series, which took place at Guangdong International Circuit, Yan won the first sprint race at the wheel of his NewFaster Team Audi RS3 LMS, collecting the points he needed to secure the Drivers’ championship.

Racing record

Complete TCR International Series results
(key) (Races in bold indicate pole position) (Races in italics indicate fastest lap)

TCR Spa 500 results

References

External links
 

1983 births
Living people
TCR Asia Series drivers
Hong Kong racing drivers
24H Series drivers
KCMG drivers
Nürburgring 24 Hours drivers
FIA Motorsport Games drivers
Engstler Motorsport drivers